Gregory Omar Santos (born August 28, 1999) is a Dominican professional baseball pitcher for the Chicago White Sox of Major League Baseball (MLB). He signed with the Boston Red Sox as an international free agent in 2015. He made his MLB debut in 2021 with the Giants.

Career

Boston Red Sox
Santos signed with the Boston Red Sox as an international free agent on August 28, 2015, for $275,000. He spent the 2016 season with the DSL Red Sox, going 3–3 with a 4.17 ERA over 41 innings.

San Francisco Giants

2017–2019
On July 26, 2017, Santos and Shaun Anderson were traded to the San Francisco Giants in exchange for Eduardo Núñez. He split the 2017 season between the DSL Red Sox and the DSL Giants, going a combined 3–0 with a 1.29 ERA over 49 innings.

He played for the Salem-Keizer Volcanoes in 2018, posting a 2–5 record with a 4.53 ERA over  innings, and was named a Northwest League mid-season All Star. He played for the Augusta GreenJackets in 2019, going 1–5 with a 2.86 ERA over  innings. Santos missed the second half of the 2019 season due to shoulder issues.

2020–present
Santos did not play in a game in 2020 due to the cancellation of the minor league season because of the COVID-19 pandemic. On November 20, 2020, Santos was added to the 40-man roster.

On April 22, 2021, Santos was promoted to the major leagues for the first time. He made his MLB debut that day against the Miami Marlins, pitching a scoreless inning of relief, and was the 6th-youngest player in the NL. In the game, he also notched his first two major league strikeouts, punching out Magneuris Sierra and Jazz Chisholm Jr. On April 28, Santos was optioned to the Giants' alternate site in Sacramento to make room for new outfielder Mike Tauchman. He later began his minor league season with the Triple-A Sacramento River Cats.

On June 29, 2021, Santos was suspended 80 games after he tested positive for the banned androgen and anabolic steroid Stanozolol.

He played in 2021 for the Scottsdale Scorpions, for whom he was 0–1 with a 4.15 ERA in 10 relief appearances, and was named an Arizona Fall League Rising Star.

In 2022 playing in the minors for Sacramento and briefly for the ACL Giants Black, he was a combined 1-2 with one save and a 4.63 ERA in 35 games (2 starts) in which he pitched 35 innings. In 2022 with the Giants he made two relief appearances, and in 3.2 innings gave up 3 hits, 3 walks, and had two strikeouts.

On December 19, 2022, Santos was designated for assignment.

Chicago White Sox
On December 22, 2022, Santos was traded to the Chicago White Sox in exchange for minor league pitcher Kade McClure.

References

External links

1999 births
Living people
Major League Baseball players from the Dominican Republic
Major League Baseball pitchers
San Francisco Giants players
Dominican Republic sportspeople in doping cases
Dominican Summer League Red Sox players
Dominican Summer League Giants players
Salem-Keizer Volcanoes players
Augusta GreenJackets players